2CB-Ind is a conformationally-restricted derivative of the phenethylamine hallucinogen 2C-B, discovered in 1974 by Alexander Shulgin. It acts as a moderately potent and selective agonist for the 5-HT2A and 5-HT2C receptors, but unlike the corresponding benzocyclobutene derivative TCB-2 which is considerably more potent than the parent compound 2C-B, 2CB-Ind is several times weaker, with racemic 2CB-Ind having a Ki of 47nM at the human 5-HT2A receptor, only slightly more potent than the mescaline analogue (R)-jimscaline.

Analogues and derivatives

See also 
 AMMI

References 

Bromoarenes
Hydroquinone ethers
Indanes
Phenethylamines
Methoxy compounds